Senator Herrick may refer to:

Charles Herrick (1814–1886), Wisconsin State Senate
Ebenezer Herrick (1785–1839), Maine State Senate
Walter R. Herrick (1877–1953), New York State Senate